"String of Pain" is the first single by Japanese voice actor Tetsuya Kakihara, released on February 6, 2013. The title song was used in the ending theme for anime 八犬伝―東方八犬異聞― (Hakkenden: Eight Dogs of the East) in which Tetsuya Kakihara also voices the main character of Shino Inuzuka

Track listing

References

2013 singles
J-pop songs